William Elbridge Sewell (November 16, 1851 – March 17, 1904) was a United States Navy Lieutenant Commander and the 6th Naval Governor of Guam from February 9, 1903, until he returned to the mainland United States for medical treatment on January 11, 1904. He was born in Colchester, New York and appointed to the United States Naval Academy from that state in 1867. He served on numerous ships before becoming an ensign, and eventually became executive officer or commanding officer of a series of ships and installations. He then became commanding officer of the Guam flagship, and soon after, governor of Guam. As governor, he initiated a series of tax and legal reforms, including many that restored the rights of the native population to practice their culture more freely. He legalized and taxed alcohol and set up a court system that lasted 30 years. In January 1904, he fell ill from intestinal troubles and was transported to California for treatment, where he died while still in office.

Life
Sewell was born November 16, 1851 in Colchester, New York. He married Minnie Moore on October 14, 1890, and had three daughters. His wife died in 1901 when their children were still young. In Guam, Sewell became seriously ill with an intestinal disorder, and was brought to San Francisco, California for treatment aboard . He arrived in California on March 1, 1904, and died shortly after on March 17. His daughter Helen Sewell later became a famous children's book illustrator. Another of his daughters, Marjorie Sewell Cautley, became an acclaimed landscape architect.

Naval career
Sewell was appointed to the United States Naval Academy in 1867 by Congressman William C. Fields. He graduated the academy in 1871. His first post after graduation was aboard , where served on a mission to deliver supplies to the Polaris expedition and then to receive a visiting Russian fleet. He remained there thirteen months before being reposted back to Congress.

Following the Virginius Affair, Congress sailed to Key West, where Sewell took part in several drills and exercises on the Florida Bay before returning to Norfolk, Virginia aboard . There he became an ensign and began assisting in deep-sea exploration and sounding of the Gulf of Mexico and Gulf of Maine.

In 1882 and 1883, he served at the United States Naval Observatory. From there he was ordered to  during its tour of Asian ports. For his services aboard this ship he received a commendatory letter from the Secretary of the Navy. In April 1891, he relinquished command of the Mare Island Observatory and reported for a tour of China aboard . From July 1894 to May 1897 he once again commanded the Mare Island Observatory, where he was placed in charge of accurate time keeping for the West Coast of the United States and distribution of marine chronometers to ships in the Pacific Fleet. He participated in the Battle of Santiago de Cuba, for which he received commendation from commanding Admiral William T. Sampson.

He was in Pago Pago when the United States assumed control of the island chain. In 1900, he served in equipment department of the Brooklyn Navy Yard and then equipment officer at the Portsmouth Naval Shipyard. He later became commanding officer of USS Supply, which became the flagship for Guam when he became governor.

Governorship
During his term as governor, Sewell issued twenty-four orders, most of them concerned with taxes. He conducted major overhauls of the taxation, criminal code, and prison system. He also repealed a number of laws limiting the practice of native Guamanian culture, including once again allowing United States military personnel to live among the Chamorro people and allowing the Caroline Islands to wear native clothing and participate in cockfights. At first, he raised the property taxes, which had only been one percent under Spanish rule, which caused many natives to default and lose their land. After a series of crop failures caused economic hardship on the island, he reduced property taxes by fifty percent.

He also issued a number of corporate reforms. He legalized alcohol, allowing its manufacture and sale given the government issue of a special license to do so. He continued the unpopular policy of keeping those with leprosy separate from the general populace and improved the judicial laws of the island with General Order 69 on November 30, 1903. The court system he set up lasted until the 1930s. Under his administration, the first telegraph cable reached the island. On March 18, 1904, Sewell died while in office.

References

1851 births
1904 deaths
Deaths from digestive disease
Governors of Guam
People from Delaware County, New York
Prohibition in the United States
United States Naval Academy alumni
United States Navy officers